Lebanon has competed at every edition of the quadrennial Mediterranean Games event since the inaugural edition in 1951. As of 2018, Lebanese athletes have won a total of 75 medals.

Overview

By event

See also
Lebanon at the Olympics
Lebanon at the Paralympics

References

External links
Medals table per country and per Games at the official International Committee of Mediterranean Games (CIJM) website